The following is a list of Santa Clara Valley Transportation Authority bus routes. Route numbers are classified as follows:
 Lines 1-99 are standard local bus routes, which feature many, closely spaced stops. These lines serve a smaller area, such as connecting transit centers to the surrounding community or Downtown San Jose to nearby neighborhoods.
 Lines 100-199 are express services and primarily operate during peak periods only. These lines operate express mainly on freeways and provide fewer stops than local services, mainly at train stations and major transfer points in Santa Clara County. These also charge higher fares than standard bus routes.
 Lines 200-299 are school services that operate limited service to several area high schools.
 Lines 500-599 are limited stop "Rapid" branded routes.
 Lines 800-899 are commuter rail shuttles that operate mainly during peak periods. These lines operate of Great America ACE/Amtrak Station and serve nearby high-tech businesses and industrial parks.
 Lines 900-999 are intercity routes operated in conjunction with other agencies.

VTA embarked on a large network redesign that was implemented on December 28, 2019. This eliminated the DASH shuttle, Almaden Light Rail shuttle, limited-branded bus service, community bus service, and many express routes but established a core frequent network and increased service on numerous local bus routes.

Regular bus service 
Santa Clara VTA operates numerous bus lines that operate on most major thoroughfares throughout Santa Clara County. Several of these lines converge at key transfer points, including Downtown San Jose, several Caltrain stations between Palo Alto and Gilroy, and most light rail stations. Some lines also provide connecting services to other transit agencies, including AC Transit, Dumbarton Express, Monterey-Salinas Transit, and SamTrans.

Included in this listing are VTA's limited-stop Rapid services, as those levy the same cash fares as regular local buses.

Rapid bus service 
Currently, the VTA operates one arterial rapid transit line, a precursor to Bus Rapid Transit (BRT) service, the Rapid 522. This service operates along one of Santa Clara County's major commercial corridors, El Camino Real, between Palo Alto and East San Jose. It stops at 30 intersections and transit centers that provide timed and extensive connections to other bus and light rail services, a far fewer number of stops than line 22 that operates on the same corridor.

On January 6, 2014, VTA expanded the Rapid 522 hours on weekdays and Saturdays to end at approximately 10:30 pm while introducing a new Sunday schedule operating between 9 am and 6 pm.

This service operates daily; for service outside of operating hours, use Line 22.

Similar to the BRT systems for which it is a precursor, Rapid Line 522 utilizes queue-jump lanes, traffic signal priority, and enhanced bus stop designs that provide riders with quicker service to and from major attractions in Palo Alto, Mountain View, Sunnyvale, Santa Clara, and San Jose.

VTA started construction in March 2014 on the Santa Clara-Alum Rock Bus Rapid Transit Project , which will upgrade the section of the Rapid 522 between Eastridge Transit Center and the SAP Center at San Jose to BRT service. The new BRT service will feature special hybrid vehicles with Wi-Fi on board, enhanced stations,  dedicated lanes on Alum Rock, transit signal priority, electronic real-time information message signs, off-board payment and all-door boarding to speed up stops, and service every 10 minutes at peak times.

In the future, VTA has plans to upgrade the rest of the Rapid 522 route to BRT service with the El Camino Real Bus Rapid Transit Project .

VTA replaced line 168 with line 568 in October 2021 due to many passenger complaints that line 68 took too long to get between Gilroy and San Jose. Line 568 is a weekday service that has fewer stops than line 68 with quicker travel times between Gilroy and San Jose, but utilizes Monterey Road rather than using local freeways like most Express routes except for most of Morgan Hill.

Special bus services

Express routes 
VTA's Express Bus routes operate along many of Santa Clara County's freeways, including Highway 85, Highway 237, Interstate 280 and U.S. Route 101. The buses used on these lines are suburban-style Gillig low-floor buses that have WiFi capability on board.

These services mainly operate during weekday peak periods only, operating in the typical commute direction.

Due to the large subsidy per rider to operate express bus routes, VTA eliminated most express bus routes in the December 28, 2019 network redesign, except for those serving the Stanford Industrial Park, which funded the cost of operating the service. Fares are higher than standard bus fares.

School tripper routes 
VTA operates a collection of routes timed specifically to serve students at local high schools. These services only operate around bell times when schools are in session.

ACE (Altamont Corridor Express) shuttles 
The VTA, in conjunction with many private entities and high-tech companies, as well as in coordination with Altamont Corridor Express, operates free shuttles to and from various light rail stations and Great America Station to serve businesses in Sunnyvale, Mountain View, Milpitas, Santa Clara, and San Jose. Passengers can ride these shuttles for free as funding for these services are provided by grants from high-tech companies and business associations based in Santa Clara County, as well as from the Bay Area Air Quality Management District. These mainly operate weekdays only (except holidays).

All shuttles listed below originate from Great America Station and are operated in coordination with ACE train arrival times in the morning peak and departure times in the afternoon peak.

For a map of these services, click here

SCVMC Shuttle

Regional services 
The VTA collaborates with other regional agencies that operate into and out of Santa Clara County with inter-agency transfers and commuter benefits. However, these lines do not use VTA's own buses nor levy VTA's bus fares; instead, these are operated by a consortium of operators, in which the agency is a participant, and the consortium sets the fares for such services.

References 

Bus routes
01
Bus routes
Santa Clara VTA bus routes
Santa Clara VTA bus routes
Santa Clara VTA
Santa Clara VTA bus routes
Bus routes